Deathblow Hill, first published in 1935, is a detective story by Phoebe Atwood Taylor which features her series detective Asey Mayo, the "Codfish Sherlock".  This novel is a mystery of the type known as a whodunnit.

Plot summary

Between two neighboring Cape Cod houses there is a chain link fence topped with barbed wire to signify the feud between the two halves of the Howes family.  The disappearance of the fortune left by ancestor Bellamy Howes has divided Suzanne from her eccentric relative Simon.  The fence has kept them apart, but now there are mysterious things happening at both homes—unexplained ransackings, unexplained prowlers wearing yellow handkerchiefs, and two near stranglings.  When wealthy Benjamin Carson is strangled and left on the doorstep of one of the two houses on Deathblow Hill, Asey Mayo is called in to set to right both little mysteries (such as Bellamy's ships-in-bottles collection) and large mysteries like a tidy murderer.

1935 American novels
Novels by Phoebe Atwood Taylor
Novels set on Cape Cod and the Islands